Charles Turnbull (25 February 1851 – 24 March 1920) was an English cricketer. He played one match for Gloucestershire in 1873.

References

1851 births
1920 deaths
English cricketers
Gloucestershire cricketers
Cricketers from Gloucester